Richard Hugh "Huw" Lloyd-Langton (6 February 1951 – 6 December 2012) was an English musician, best known as the guitarist for the rock band Hawkwind at various times. He also had his own band, The Lloyd Langton Group, and was the session lead guitarist for UK band The Meads of Asphodel.

Biography

Lloyd-Langton was born in Harlesden, north west London. As a member of Hawkwind he appeared on their first album, Hawkwind, before leaving the band.  He played guitar for Widowmaker, Budgie, and Leo Sayer during the 1970s, then rejoined Hawkwind in 1979, appearing on the Live Seventy Nine album release from that year and the subsequent Levitation album.

He continued performing with Hawkwind until 1988, after which he made occasional guest appearances, then rejoined for a brief spell in 2001-2002 until ill health (Legionnaires' disease) forced him to leave once more. He sometimes played solo as an acoustic support act for Hawkwind, including at The Brook in Southampton in December 2009. Acoustic slots at English charity (playing for free) and space rock events were also common throughout this decade.

Lloyd-Langton's health had been generally poor for a decade and he was quite frail, with several broken bones and minor injuries (rarely letting fans down though - he once played a gig with a broken arm, reworking his solos on the fly so that he could play them in one area of the guitar neck). He died at his home on 6 December 2012, aged 61 years old, after a two-year fight with cancer. His final recording with Hawkwind was a re-recording of Master of the Universe for the compilation album Spacehawks.

Discography

Hawkwind
1970: Hawkwind
1980: Live Seventy Nine
1980: Levitation
1981: Sonic Attack
1982: Church of Hawkwind
1982: Choose Your Masques
1985: The Chronicle of the Black Sword
1986: Live Chronicles (vocals on "Moonglum")
1987: Out & Intake
1988: The Xenon Codex
2012: Onward
2013: Spacehawks

Widowmaker
1976: Widowmaker
1977: Too Late to Cry

Lloyd-Langton Group
1984: Outside the Law (Deprecated as a bootleg on Lloyd-Langton's official site.)
1984 "Dreams that fade away" / "It's on Me" - 12 single. Limited edition. Ultra noise records.
1985: Night Air ( original release on vinyl in 1985, Re-released in a cd version 28 June 2010.) 
1987: Like An Arrow
1988: Time Space & LLG
1991: Elegy
1994: River Run
1999: Chain Reaction
2001: On The Move... Plus
2010: Hard Graft
2011: Classical Guitar Tales

Contributions
1980: Steve Swindells – Fresh Blood

References

External links
 Official website
 
 
 Huw Lloyd-Langton talks about Hawkwind, Fragile, tribute bands and Live at the Half Moon

1951 births
2012 deaths
English rock guitarists
People from Harlesden
Hawkwind members
English people of Welsh descent
Deaths from cancer in England
Place of death missing
Widowmaker (U.K. band) members